The Patrick Star Show is an American animated comedy television series developed by Luke Brookshier, Marc Ceccarelli, Andrew Goodman, Kaz, Mr. Lawrence, and Vincent Waller that premiered on Nickelodeon on July 9, 2021. It is a spinoff of SpongeBob SquarePants that focuses on Patrick Star and his family hosting a talk show. In March 2022, the series was renewed for a second season.

Premise
Patrick Star hosts his very own talk show at his family home, with the support of his family.

Characters

 Patrick Star (voiced by Bill Fagerbakke), the host of The Patrick Star Show
 Cecil Star (voiced by Tom Wilson), the father of Patrick Star who works at the Undersea Space Agency
 Bunny Star (voiced by Cree Summer), the mother of Patrick Star
 Squidina Star (voiced by Jill Talley), a squid who is the adopted sister of Patrick Star that helps in the production of The Patrick Star Show
 GrandPat Star (voiced by Dana Snyder), the grandfather of Patrick Star and father of Cecil who is the intelligent member of the Star family and uses a mobility scooter as his mode of transportation
 Ouchie (vocal effects provided by Tom Kenny), the Star family's pet sea urchin.
 Tinkle (vocal effects provided by Dee Bradley Baker), a sentient and animalistic toilet that is the Star family's other pet.
 Grandma Tentacles (voiced by Cree Summer), an octopus who is the Star family's neighbor and Squidward's grandmother; She was previously portrayed by Mary Jo Catlett in the original series

Characters from the original series — including SpongeBob SquarePants (voiced by Tom Kenny), Squidward Tentacles (voiced by Rodger Bumpass), Sandy Cheeks (voiced by Carolyn Lawrence), Mr. Krabs (voiced by Clancy Brown), Pearl Krabs (voiced by Lori Alan), and Plankton (voiced by Mr. Lawrence) — also appear in guest roles.

Production
On August 10, 2020, it was announced that SpongeBob SquarePants would be receiving its second spinoff series, following Kamp Koral: SpongeBob's Under Years, and that the focus of the series would be on Patrick Star. In March 2021, it was announced that Nickelodeon had ordered 13 episodes, with the series set to release in summer 2021. On May 31, 2021, it was announced that the series would premiere in July 2021, and the first teaser trailer for the series was released. On June 17, 2021, it was announced that the series would premiere on July 9, 2021.

According to showrunner Marc Ceccarelli, the writers of The Patrick Star Show bent the rules of the original SpongeBob universe to allow for more creative freedom. Ceccarelli explained: "We really tried to just do anything we wanted... We mess with canon [the original series' continuity] a lot. I don't know if anybody knows this, but we don't really respect canon just for the sake of itself." The writers also aimed to "sideline" story structures, which "frees [them] up to be more surreal and randomly bizarre with the kinds of things [they] put out there."

On August 11, 2021, it was announced that Nickelodeon had ordered 13 additional episodes for the series, bringing the series to 26 produced episodes. On March 21, 2022, Nickelodeon renewed the series for a second season.

On July 21, 2022, a "SpongeBob Universe" crossover special was announced, featuring the main series and spinoffs The Patrick Star Show and Kamp Koral. "The Tidal Zone", a spoof of The Twilight Zone, was originally set to premiere on Nickelodeon on November 25, 2022, before getting delayed and rescheduled for release on January 13, 2023.

Episodes

Shorts

Home media

Reception
Common Sense Media gave the series a four out of five stars, writing, "Starfish spin-off has goofy fun, lots of slapstick violence."

Notes

References

External links

 
 

2020s Nickelodeon original programming
2020s American animated television series
SpongeBob SquarePants
American animated television spin-offs
Animated television series about animals
Animated television series about families
2020s American children's comedy television series
English-language television shows
2020s American animated comedy television series
American children's animated comedy television series
Nicktoons
Television series about television
Television series by Rough Draft Studios
2021 American television series debuts